Chatkal Range is a range in the Western Tian Shan that borders Ferghana Valley from northwest. The length of the range is 225 km, and it is up to 30 km wide. The highest peak is Avletim (4503 m elevation). Northern slopes are steep and short, while southern ones are gentle. The range is composed by primarily of limestone, granite, and schist.

References

Mountain ranges of Kyrgyzstan
Mountain ranges of Uzbekistan
Mountain ranges of the Tian Shan